Ram Aur Shyam (English: Ram And Shyam) is a 1967 Indian Hindi-language comedy-drama film directed by Tapi Chanakya. The film is a remake of Chanakya's 1964 Telugu film Ramudu Bheemudu. It stars Dilip Kumar in a double role as twin brothers, alongside Waheeda Rehman, Mumtaz, Nirupa Roy, Pran. The music was composed by Naushad, with lyrics written by Shakeel Badayuni. 

Ram Aur Shyam was the second highest-grossing Indian film of 1967, domestically in India and overseas. It was listed at number 15 in "Top 50 Film of Last 50 years" list compiled by Box Office India magazine in 2011 which featured all-time highest-grossing Bollywood films by using gold-price inflation. The film received 3 nominations at the 15th Filmfare Awards, including Best Actress for Waheeda Rehman and Best Supporting Actress for Mumtaz and won Best Actor for Dilip Kumar.

Plot
Ram (Dilip Kumar) lives with his sister Sulakshana (Nirupa Roy) and niece Kuku in his family estate. His brother-in-law Gajendra (Pran) is a ghar jamai who looks after his factories and controls his property with an iron hand. Ram is shy and cowardly in nature. He is always abused and brutally beaten by Gajendra. Sulakshana and Kuku try to protect Ram from Gajendra whenever he whips Ram. Everybody decides to get Ram married for his well being. 

Gajendra finds a rich girl Anjana (Waheeda Rehman) with the aim of getting a huge dowry. Anjana dislikes Ram after he spills tea over her due to nervousness. Gajendra, angry at Ram's behaviour, conspires with the support of his mother and cunning Munimji to kill Ram and take over his property. Ram overhears this and escapes to the city to save his life. Meanwhile, Ram's long lost twin brother Shyam (also Dilip Kumar) lives in a village with his adopted mother Ganga, whom he believes to be his biological mother. No one other than Ganga knows the truth about the twin brothers. 

Shyam is strong, brave and mischievous, unlike his brother. He has a love-hate relationship with Shanta (Mumtaz). Shyam escapes to the city, after a mischievous conflict with Ganga, and meets Anjana, who is impressed by his personality. Anjana and her father confuse Shyam with Ram. Ram meets Shanta, who thinks he is Shyam and takes him forcefully to his mother. Ram and Shanta develop feelings for each other. Meanwhile, Shyam decides to take the place of Ram to face Gajendra. 

Shyam refuses to sign his property over, after which angry Gajendra attacks him. Shyam retaliates and whips Gajendra hard, shocking everybody. Sulakshana stops her brother to protect her husband. Gajendra is startled after being beaten up by Shyam, whom everybody believes as Ram. Shanta and Anjana meet and both claim the picture of Ram as their fiancé. Gajendra learns that Shyam has taken the place of Ram. He abducts Ram and Shanta, and plans to kill Ram. He frames Shyam for the murder of Ram though Ram is alive. Shyam is arrested by police. Anjana and her father learn from Ganga that Ram and Shyam are twin brothers lost in a village fair. 

They also learn about the true colour of Gajendra. Shyam escapes from police custody and battles Gajendra and his henchmen. Gajendra tries to shoot them, but both the brothers and Shanta manage to defeat him. At the end, the twin brothers are happily married and the family reunited.

Cast
 Dilip Kumar as Ram / Shyam (Double Role) 
 Waheeda Rehman as Anjana
 Mumtaz as Shanta
 Nirupa Roy as Sulakshana
 Pran as Gajendra 
 Nazir Hussain as Rai Sahib Gangadhar
 Kanhaiyalal as Munimji
 Mukri as Gopal
 Sajjan as Police Inspector
 Raj Kishore as Restaurant Waiter
 Baby Farida as Kuku
 Laxmi Chhaya as Dancer
 Leela Mishra as Ganga
 Zebunnisa as Gajendra's Mother

Reception 
Dilip Kumar, who was known as "Tragedy-King" surprised the audience with his comic performance, which won him Best Actor at the 15th Filmfare Awards.

Box-Office 
At the domestic Indian box office, Ram Aur Shyam grossed  nett. It was 1967's second highest-grossing film in India, after Upkar.

Overseas at the Soviet box office, Ram Aur Shyam was released with 1,160 prints and sold  tickets in 1972. It was the second highest-grossing 1967 Indian film in the Soviet Union, after Hamraaz.

Worldwide, the film grossed  by 1972.

Legacy 
Dilip Kumar stated in an interview "The script of Ram Aur Shyam (1967) offered me endless stimulation. Each scene was sharply written to highlight the contrast between the characters and their predicaments."

According to Rediff.com, the most famous twin act in India, remains to be Dilip Kumar's turn in Ram Aur Shyam. The film is also included in their list of "Landmark Film of 60s".

International DVD release 
The movie was dubbed in Russian and released as Рам и Шиам.

Soundtrack

Lyrics were written by Shakeel Badayuni.

References

External links 
 
 

1967 films
1960s Hindi-language films
Indian comedy-drama films
Films about twin brothers
Films directed by Tapi Chanakya
Films scored by Naushad
Hindi remakes of Telugu films
Twins in Indian films 
Films about twins